Margaret Bryan (fl. 1815) was an English natural philosopher and educator, and the author of standard scientific textbooks. She was schoolmistress of a school located at various times in Blackheath, at Cadogan Place, and in Margate at Bryan House above the yet to be discovered Margate Caves. Her first known work was Compendious System of Astronomy (1797), collecting her lectures on astronomy. She later published Lectures on Natural Philosophy (1806), a textbook on the fundamentals of physics and astronomy, and an Astronomical and Geographical Class Book for Schools, a thin octavo, in 1815.

Life
The year of her birth is uncertain, probably before 1760. She married a Mr Bryan and had at least two daughters, as shown in a portrait of her.

Teaching

Bryan was a schoolmistress. Her school appears to have been situated at one time at Blackheath, at that time a village south-east of London; at another at 27 Lower Cadogan Place, near Hyde Park Corner, in the fashionable West End of the capital; and also at Margate, in Bryan House above the yet to be discovered Margate Caves. The school was for young women.

Publications

Her published works are dated 1797 to 1815.

In 1797 she published in quarto, by subscription, a Compendious System of Astronomy, with a portrait of herself and two daughters as a frontispiece, the whole engraved by William Nutter from a miniature by Samuel Shelley. She dedicated her book to her pupils. The lectures of which the book consisted had been praised by Charles Hutton, then at Royal Military Academy, Woolwich. An octavo edition of the work was issued later. The Critical Review printed her reply to what she saw as a damaging article in that journal.

In 1806 Bryan published, also by subscription, and in quarto, Lectures on Natural Philosophy (thirteen lectures on hydrostatics, optics, pneumatics, and acoustics), with a portrait of the author, engraved by Heath, after a painting by T. Kearsley; and there is a notice in it that "Mrs. Bryan educates young ladies at Blackheath." In 1815 Bryan produced an Astronomical and Geographical Class Book for Schools, a thin octavo. The lectures had been previously available only to noblemen, educators, and booksellers. The text was supplemented with diagrams as well as portions for exercises. She described the mechanics of the air rifle, the hot air balloon, the diving bell, as well as Newton, Galileo, and Benjamin Franklin, including the latter's experiments with lightning. 

Conversations on Chemistry, published anonymously in 1806, is also ascribed to her by Watt and in the Biographical Dictionary of Living Authors (1816), but is in fact a book by Jane Marcet.

See also
Timeline of women in science

References

Attribution
 

18th-century births
19th-century deaths
18th-century British astronomers
18th-century British women scientists
18th-century English writers
19th-century English writers
18th-century English women writers
19th-century English women writers
19th-century British women scientists
19th-century English educators
18th-century English educators
18th-century British philosophers
19th-century British philosophers
People from Belgravia
People from Blackheath, London
People from Margate
Year of birth unknown
Year of death unknown
Natural philosophers
English women philosophers
19th-century British astronomers
Women astronomers